G Rene Ryan (born October 1, 1995) is an American swimmer from Kutztown, Pennsylvania. They won a US National Championship in the 800m freestyle, as well as two golds in the Pan American Games. Ryan moved to Baltimore, Maryland for their last 3 years of high school, where they are taking cyber courses from Kutztown High School so they could train at North Baltimore Aquatic Club. Ryan made the switch to the club that has produced 10 Olympians, including Michael Phelps, to remain with coach Erik Posegay. They learned that Posegay was moving to NBAC shortly after their return from Lima, Peru, where they won silver and bronze medals at the FINA World Junior Swimming Championships in 2011. Within two weeks, they were living in Baltimore and training at the club. Ryan was part of the 2012 United States Olympic Trials, finishing fourth at the 400m and seventh at the 800m.

On September 9, 2013, Ryan made a commitment to swim for Mike Bottom and the Michigan Wolverines at University of Michigan in Ann Arbor, Michigan for the start of the 2014 season. Since then, they have been involved in Trans awareness, education, and activism during their time at the University of Michigan, pushing for gender inclusive restrooms and LGBTQ and Queer inclusion in USA Swimming policies.

Notes

References 

1995 births
Living people
American female freestyle swimmers
Sportspeople from Pennsylvania
Sportspeople from Baltimore
People from Kutztown, Pennsylvania
Swimmers at the 2011 Pan American Games
Swimmers at the 2015 Pan American Games
Michigan Wolverines women's swimmers
Pan American Games gold medalists for the United States
Pan American Games medalists in swimming
American LGBT sportspeople
LGBT people from Pennsylvania
Medalists at the 2011 Pan American Games
Medalists at the 2015 Pan American Games